Sheunopa Musekwa (born 16 January 1994) is a Zimbabwean cricketer. He made his first-class debut for Matabeleland Tuskers in the 2016–17 Logan Cup on 6 May 2017. He made his Twenty20 debut for Matabeleland Tuskers in the 2018–19 Stanbic Bank 20 Series on 15 March 2019. He made his List A debut on 4 February 2020, for Matabeleland Tuskers in the 2019–20 Pro50 Championship. In December 2020, he was selected to play for the Tuskers in the 2020–21 Logan Cup.

References

External links
 

1994 births
Living people
Zimbabwean cricketers
Matabeleland Tuskers cricketers
Sportspeople from Bulawayo